Pain Mahalleh-ye Keshteli (also Romanized as Pā’īn Maḩalleh-ye Keshtelī) is a village in Gatab-e Shomali Rural District, Gatab District, Babol County, Mazandaran Province, Iran. At the 2006 census, its population was 713, in 184 families.

References 

Populated places in Babol County